Charles' Country Pan Fried Chicken a.k.a. Charles' Southern Style Kitchen, is a soul food and Southern Food restaurant located at 2461 Frederick Douglass Blvd (between 131st & 132nd Streets), in Harlem in Manhattan, in New York City. It was featured on Al Roker's episode of My Life in Food.

Background
Charles Gabriel was raised in the Southern United States along with his 20 siblings. He learned to cook from his mother, and moved to New York cooking out of a food cart. He currently cooks the food at his own restaurant, and is a consulting chef at Rack & Soul.

When preparing his chicken, Charles fries it in a pan, repeatedly turning the chicken, as well as seasoning it at three separate stages. The venue has two addresses, one of which serves as the kitchen and one of which serves as the dining area. Magazine recipe writers have interviewed him and attempted to reproduce his techniques and recipes.

In 2013, Zagat gave it a food rating of 24, and a decor rating of 4.

See also
 List of soul food restaurants

References

African-American history in New York City
Harlem
Restaurants in Manhattan
Soul food restaurants in the United States